United Nations Security Council resolution 821, adopted on 28 April 1993, after reaffirming Resolution 713 (1991) and all subsequent resolutions, the council also recalled resolutions 757 (1992), 777 (1992) and General Assembly Resolution 47/1 (1992) which stated that the state formerly known as the Socialist Federal Republic of Yugoslavia had ceased to exist and that it should apply for membership in the United Nations and until then should not participate in the General Assembly.

Resolution 821 stated that the Federal Republic of Yugoslavia (Serbia and Montenegro) cannot automatically continue the membership of the former Socialist Federal Republic of Yugoslavia in the United Nations, and therefore recommends to the General Assembly that it decide that the Federal Republic of Yugoslavia (Serbia and Montenegro) shall not participate in the work of the United Nations Economic and Social Council, deciding to consider the matter again before the end of the 47th session of the General Assembly.

The resolution was approved by 13 votes to none, with two abstentions from China and Russia.

See also
 United Nations Security Council Resolution 1326
 Breakup of Yugoslavia
 List of United Nations Security Council Resolutions 801 to 900 (1993–1994)
 Succession of states
 Yugoslav Wars

References

External links
 
Text of the Resolution at undocs.org

 0821
 0821
1993 in Yugoslavia
 0821
 0821
April 1993 events